Sport Lisboa e Benfica, commonly known as Benfica, is a Portuguese women's football team based in Lisbon that plays in the Campeonato Nacional Feminino, the top-level women's football league in Portugal, following promotion in the 2018–19 season.

Founded on 12 December 2017, it is the women's football section of sports club S.L. Benfica. They have won two consecutive First Division titles, one Second Division title, one Portuguese Cup, two League Cups and two Super Cups.

Their current home grounds are the 2,230-seater Estádio Municipal José Martins Vieira, in Almada, and Benfica Campus in Seixal, with the team occasionally playing at Estádio da Luz in Lisbon.

History
On 12 December 2017, Benfica publicly confirmed that it was forming a long-mooted women's football team. Compiling a squad replete with several international players and a distinctly Brazilian flavour, they entered the Portuguese second division and promptly doled out several comprehensive thrashings to their outmatched opponents.

The initial squad contained a total of seven players from Brazil (an eighth, Rilany, arrived in December). Brazilians were targeted because many had the required skills and experience. As Lusophones, they were also expected to adapt quickly to Portuguese culture. This mirrored the policy of Benfica's male team, who had a successful policy of importing talented players from the Brazilian transfer market.

On 17 September 2018, Benfica made their league debut in the Campeonato Nacional II Divisão and beat UD Ponte de Frielas 28–0. The result established a new record winning margin in Portuguese senior football, surpassing Sporting CP's 21–0 win over CS Mindelense in 1971. Former Benfica player Luís Andrade was appointed as technical co-ordinator of the club's women's section in October 2018. He was tasked with developing a women's B team and revamping the youth structure, which contained approximately 200 players.

On 26 January 2019, Benfica broke their own Portuguese scoring record by thrashing CP Pego 32–0 at the Estádio da Tapadinha, increasing their league tally to 257 goals scored and none conceded in 14 matches, and the overall tally to 293–0 in 16 matches. Four days later, Benfica conceded a goal for the first time in their history, in a 5–1 away win over Marítimo in the third round of the Portuguese Cup.

Campeonato Nacional side Braga inflicted Benfica's first ever defeat on 24 March 2019, winning 2–1 away in the first leg of the Portuguese Cup semi-final. Six days later, Benfica met Sporting CP in the first but unofficial female Derby de Lisboa between their main teams. The match was staged at the Estádio do Restelo to raise money for the Cyclone Idai relief effort in Mozambique, attracting 15,204 spectators – a national record crowd at the time for a women's match in Portugal. Despite dominating play, Benfica lost 1–0 to Joana Marchão's 86th-minute penalty kick.

On 18 May 2019, after eliminating Braga on 5–4 aggregate in the Portuguese Cup semi-finals, Benfica beat Valadares Gaia 4–0 in the final to conquer their first trophy, in a Portuguese Cup record attendance of 12,632. Following an 8–0 win over Estoril Praia B on 29 May, Benfica secured promotion to the 2019–20 Campeonato Nacional Feminino. Later, on 23 June, they were crowned second division champions as they beat Braga B on 9–0 aggregate in the finals.

After the departure of head coach João Marques, Luís Andrade took his position, and Benfica started their second season by beating Portuguese champions Braga 1–0 with a goal from Pauleta to conquer their first Super Cup trophy. A week later, Benfica debuted in the first division with a 24–0 thrashing of A-dos-Francos. On 19 October, Benfica beat Sporting 3–0 at the Estádio da Luz in the first official derby between both sides, played before 12,812 spectators, who set a new attendance record for a women's match in Portugal.

Benfica qualified to UEFA Women's Champions League's group stage for the first time after beating Twente 4–0 on 9 September 2021 (5–1 on aggregate). Benfica made their debut in the competition with a goalless home draw against Bayern Munich on 5 October.  On 17 November, Benfica secured their first victory in the group stage, 2–1 at BK Häcken FF, while scoring their first goal.

Players

Current squad

Other players under contract

Out on loan

Former players

Coaching staff
{| class="wikitable"
|-
! Position
! Name
|-
| Head coach
| Filipa Patão
|-
| Assistant coaches
| Tiago CarmoAndré ValeMarco SousaBárbara Reis
|-
| Goalkeeping coach
| Pedro Espinha
|-
| Video analyst
| Mauro Rodrigues

Records and statistics

Competition record
Benfica's performance over their completed seasons:

Key
W = Winners; RU = Runners-up; R16 = Round of 16; R32 = Round of 32; GS = Group stage

Managerial statistics
As of match played 21 May 2022. Only competitive matches are included.

Honours
 Campeonato Nacional
 Winners (2): 2020–21, 2021–22
 Campeonato Nacional II Divisão Winners (1): 2018–19
 Taça de Portugal Winners (1): 2018–19
 Taça da Liga Winners (2) – record: 2019–20, 2020–21
 Supertaça de Portugal Winners (2) – shared record:''' 2019, 2022

References

External links
  
 S.L. Benfica at thefinalball.com

 
S.L. Benfica
Women's football clubs in Portugal
Association football clubs established in 2017
2017 establishments in Portugal
Sport in Lisbon
Campeonato Nacional de Futebol Feminino teams